Hertha Feiler (3 August 1916, Vienna – 1 November 1970, Munich) was an Austrian actress. She was married to the comedian Heinz Rühmann with whom she starred in several films. She was of Jewish descent.

Filmography

 Darling of the Sailors (1937)
 All Lies (1938)
 Adresse unbekannt (1938)
 Woman in the River (1939)
 Men Are That Way (1939)
 Escape in the Dark (1939)
 Lauter Liebe (1940)
 Clothes Make the Man (1940)
 Happiness is the Main Thing (1941)
 Rembrandt (1942)
 A Salzburg Comedy (1943)
 Der Engel mit dem Saitenspiel (1944)
 Tell the Truth (1946)
 Quax in Africa (1947)
 Die kupferne Hochzeit (1948)
 Heimliches Rendezvous (1949)
 Ich mach dich glücklich (1949)
 When the White Lilacs Bloom Again (1953)
 Anna Louise and Anton (1953)
 The Beautiful Miller (1954)
 Dein Mund verspricht mir Lieb (1954)
 When the Alpine Roses Bloom  (1955)
 Let the Sun Shine Again (1955)
 Charley's Aunt (1956)
 As Long as the Roses Bloom (1956)
 Johannisnacht (1956)
 Opera Ball (1956)
 The Saint and Her Fool (1957)
 Vienna, City of My Dreams (1957)
 The Muzzle (1958)
 Sag ja, Mutti (1958)
 My Schoolfriend (1960)
 Die Ente klingelt um halb acht (1968)

References

External links

 
 Photographs and literature on Hertha Feiler

1916 births
1970 deaths
Actresses from Vienna
Austrian film actresses
20th-century Austrian actresses
Austrian emigrants to Germany